Elizabeth Harris is an Australian retired stage and television actress who appeared on a number of popular television series and films from the mid-1960s up until her retirement in 1993. She is best known for her role as Liza in the 1960s children's television series Adventure Island but also for playing recurring characters Sally Dempster in Prisoner and Clover Owen-Jones in A Country Practice in her later career. She was also the wife of longtime Australian television and radio star Leonard Teale. They married on 18 December 1968.

Biography 
Harris made her television acting debut on Consider Your Verdict in 1962. From 1962 to 1966 she co-hosted an Australian version of Video Village, with Danny Webb, on Channel 7. She was then cast in the children's television series The Magic Circle Club as a recurring character (and later replacing original host Nancy Cato, who had been injured during production), and made several guest appearances on Homicide between 1965 and 1966. She also starred in a second children's series, Adventure Island (1967) with co-stars Nancy Cato and Ernie Bourne, in what became her breakout role as the series heroine "Liza", and Hunter (1968). In July 1968, she also performed at St. Martin's Theatre with Charles Chilton, Joan Littlewood and Ted Allen in a London Theatre Workshop stage production of Oh, What a Lovely War!

She took an absence from television acting for several years but made brief appearances on The 40s in Swing Time (1973), Alvin Purple (1976) and King's Men (1979). In 1982, she was cast as Sally Dempster in the seriesPrisoner. Although she appeared on the series briefly, Harris had a memorable role as an alcoholic wife of a businessman. Her character is sent to prison for running over her husband and attempts suicide after it is revealed that she was physically abusive to her young daughter.

She also appeared on Sons and Daughters and A Country Practice that same year. Her recurring role as Clover Owen-Jones in the latter series would continue on and off for the next nine years. Harris continued to make television appearances during the 1980s with supporting roles in television films Skin Deep (1983), Shout! The Story of Johnny O'Keefe (1985) and the television series Relative Merits in 1987. Her final television appearance was in G.P. in 1993.

In January 2004, she appeared at a special book signing and screening of Lisa Milner's Fighting Films with Michael Craig and Jack Thompson. Her attendance was in honor of her late husband Leonard Teale who worked with the film company as a voice actor during the 1950s.

Filmography 

TELEVISION

References

External links 

Year of birth missing (living people)
Living people
Australian stage actresses
Australian television actresses
Actresses from Melbourne